"Stars" is a dance-pop single written and produced by American singer Kristine W and Nick Helbling a.k.a. Nikka Bling. With the January 27, 2018, issue of Billboard, "Stars" became Kristine W's 17th number-one single on the Dance Club Songs chart.

Track listing

Original mixes
 U.S.
 Stars (Hans Mallon/Kespa Radio)
 Stars (Hans Mallon/Kespa Club Mix)
 Stars (Alex Acosta After Midnight Radio)
 Stars (Alex Acosta After Midnight Club)
 Stars (Alex Acosta After Midnight Dub)

Freejak mixes
 U.S.
 Stars (Freejak Radio)
 Stars (Freejak Club)
 Stars (Freejak Dub)

Candlelight mixes
 U.S.
 Stars (Vegas Strong Candlelight Mix)
 Stars (Vegas Strong Candlelight Mix Stripped)

Charts

See also
List of number-one dance singles of 2018 (U.S.)

References

2017 songs
2017 singles
Kristine W songs
Songs written by Kristine W